Bucksburn Academy is the only state secondary school in Bucksburn, a suburb/town in Aberdeen, Scotland serving as the sole provider of secondary education.  Bucksburn Academy's catchment area includes the suburbs of Bucksburn, Newhills and Kingswells, though some pupils do attend from other nearby areas, such as Stoneywood and Dyce.

The school has a dedicated Additional Support Wing which has capacity for 96 children. The wing is a city-wide provision that provides education for children with moderate to severe and complex additional support needs

The languages taught at the school are French, German Spanish and sometimes Mandarin.

Bucksburn Academy opened in late October 2009 and replaced the existing Bankhead Academy. The new school had some of the greatest facilities in Scotland, rivalling only those of Cults Academy in the city. When the new school opened, wholesale changes occurred with the introduction of a new head teacher and multiple members of existing staff were replaced.

Houses
Bucksburn Academy has four houses each named after Scotland in different languages: Alba (green), Caledonia (blue), Scotia (red) and Ecosse (purple).

External links
Official website
Official School Handbook 2020/2021

References

2009 establishments in Scotland
Educational institutions established in 2009
Secondary schools in Aberdeen